Walt Rogers (born July 5, 1961) was  the Iowa State Representative from the 60th District. A Republican, he has served in the Iowa House of Representatives since 2011.

, Rogers serves on several committees in the Iowa House – the Appropriations, Judiciary, State Government, and Transportation committees.  He also serves as the vice chair of the Administration and Regulation Appropriations Subcommittee and as a member of the Research and Development School Advisory Council.

On October 1, 2013, Rogers announced his candidacy for United States Congress in Iowa's 1st congressional district in the 2014 election cycle.

He was born and raised in Waterloo, Iowa.

Electoral history
In his first campaign for public office, Rogers lost his 2008 election bid for the Iowa Senate's 10th District, losing to incumbent Democrat Jeff Danielson by a margin of only 22 votes.  Rogers was elected in 2010, defeating incumbent Democrat Doris Kelley; he was reelected in 2012 over challenger Bob Greenwood.

References

External links

 Walt Rogers official Iowa General Assembly site
 Walt Rogers Campaign website
 
 Financial information (state office) at the National Institute for Money in State Politics
 Walt Rogers at Iowa House Republicans

Republican Party members of the Iowa House of Representatives
Living people
University of Northern Iowa alumni
People from Cedar Falls, Iowa
Politicians from Waterloo, Iowa
1961 births
21st-century American politicians